The Barlas (Chagatay/ Barlās; also Berlās) were a Mongol and later Turkicized nomadic confederation in Central Asia. With military roots in one of the regiments of the original Mongol army, the Barlas spawned two major imperial dynasties in Asia: the Timurid Empire in Central Asia and Persia; and its later branch, the Mughal Empire in the Indian subcontinent.

Origins 

According to the Secret History of the Mongols, written during the reign of Ögedei Khan [r. 1229–1241], the Barlas shared ancestry with the Borjigin, the imperial clan of Genghis Khan and his successors, and other Mongol clans. The leading clan of the Barlas traced its origin to Qarachar Barlas, head of one of Chagatai's regiments. Qarachar Barlas was a descendant of the legendary Mongol warlord Bodonchir (Bodon Achir; Bodon'ar Mungqaq), who was also considered a direct ancestor of Genghis Khan. The internal structure of the Barlas' leading clan consisted of five major lineages– tracing back to the sons of Qarachar– who were important in matters of inheritance but did not constitute separate political or territorial entities.

The Barlas controlled the region of Kish (modern Shahrisabz, Uzbekistan) and all of its lineages seem to have been associated with this region. In contrast to most neighboring tribes who remained nomadic, the Barlas were a sedentary tribe. Due to extensive contacts with the native population of Central Asia, the tribe had adopted the religion of Islam, and the Chagatai language, a Turkic language of the Qarluq branch, which was heavily influenced by Arabic and Persian. Although the Barlas were not always exogamous, most marriages recorded were outside the tribe.

Timurids and Mughals 

Its most famous representatives were the Timurids, a dynasty founded by the conqueror Timur (Tamerlane) in the 14th century, who ruled over modern-day Iran, Armenia, Azerbaijan, Georgia, and almost the entire rest of the Caucasus, Afghanistan, much of Central Asia, as well as parts of contemporary Pakistan, Mesopotamia, and Anatolia. One of his descendants, Babur, later founded the Mughal Empire of Central Asia and South Asia.

See also 
 Turco-Mongol tradition
 Timurid dynasty
 Mughal Empire
 Hazara of Muhammad Khwaja
 Hajji Beg Barlas

References 

 
Former confederations
Borjigin